Nuestra Belleza Nuevo León 2008 was a beauty pageant which was held at the Teatro de la Ciudad in Monterrey, Nuevo León on June 25, 2008. At the conclusion of the final night of competition, Mariana González of Monterrey was crowned the winner. González was crowned by outgoing Nuestra Belleza Nuevo León titleholder and Nuestra Belleza Mundo México 2007, Anagabriela Espinoza. Ten contestants competed for the state title.

The pageant was hosted by Nuestra Belleza Nuevo León 2005 and Miss International 2007 Priscila Perales and Arturo Carmona.

Results

Placements

Judges
Alejandra Quintero - Nuestra Belleza Mundo México 1995
Verónica Gutiérrez - Nuestra Belleza Nuevo León 2000
Diana García - Nuestra Belleza Nuevo León 2001
Carolina Salinas - Nuestra Belleza Nuevo León 2002 & Miss Expo World 2002
Alejandra Villanueva - Nuestra Belleza Nuevo León 2003

Background Music
Kika Edgar - "Lo Siento mi Amor", "Acaríciame" & "Como Tú"
Kudai - "Lejos De Aquí" y "Nada es Igual".

References

External links
Official Website

Nuestra Belleza México